Labor of Love is an American dating game show that aired on Fox from May 21 to July 16, 2020. The show was hosted by Sex and the City actress Kristin Davis and starred former The Bachelor season 11 contestant Kristy Katzmann. Over eight episodes, 15 men participated in challenges and dates that tested their parenting and personal skills. Those whom Katzmann found satisfactory advanced to the following episode, and at the end of the series, she decided  with the help of Davis  whether to choose one of the men to start a family with or not. The show began production in mid-2017.

The show has sparked some backlash online and has been described by some critics as "bizarre" and "dangerous in gamifying and making a competition out of the creation of life."

After filming ended, Katzmann dated the winner, Kyle Klinger, for a few months, but the couple broke up and Katzmann chose to pursue in vitro fertilization on her own.

On September 8, 2021, it was revealed that the series was officially cancelled.

Contestants
The cast consists of 15 eligible men.

Ratings

References

External links
 
 
2020s American game shows
2020 American television series debuts
2020 American television series endings
2020s American reality television series
American dating and relationship reality television series
English-language television shows
Fox Broadcasting Company original programming